Walter H. Gladwin (October 21, 1902 – June 12, 1988) was an American politician in the Bronx in the mid-20th century.  He was the first black person to be elected to the New York State Assembly, be appointed an assistant district attorney or be named a criminal court judge in the Bronx.  A park in the neighborhood where he served was renamed in his honor in 2020.

Professional career 
Gladwin was admitted to the bar in 1942. In 1943, he was named Deputy Collector of Internal Revenue for the Third District of New York, and in 1946, Assistant Corporation Counsel for the City of New York.

In 1952, Gladwin was elected to the New York Assembly for district 7, and for district 6 in 1954 and 1956 after district lines were redrawn. With the support of Elias Karmon and the Jackson Democratic Club, he won all three races by wide margins, getting 64%, 76%, and 69% of the vote respectively. While serving in the assembly, he advocated for the U.S. Congress to withhold federal aid from states which did not comply with the Supreme Court's school desegregation order. In 1957, he was appointed by Mayor Robert Wagner to a judgeship in the New York Criminal Court, in which capacity he presided over the Adele Morales case.

Gladwin was the first black person in the Bronx to serve in either the Assembly or as a criminal court judge, as well as being the first black assistant district attorney in the Bronx. In the early 1950s, a number of political parties in New York City nominated black candidates: Andronicus Jacobs for Manhattan Borough President by the American Labor Party, Elmer Carter for the New York State Commission Against Discrimination by the Republican Party, and James Robinson by the Liberal Party. The Democratic Party nominated Gladwin under pressure from Ewart Gunier's Harlem Affairs Committee to respond to these events.

Other positions 
Gladwin served in many voluntary and civic positions. He was president of the Bronx chapter of the NAACP, director of the Bronx Chamber of commerce, and a member of the executive board of the Boy Scouts of America. He was also vice-chairman of the Bronx Committee of the National Conference of Christians and Jews, and was on the board of directors for the Forest Neighborhood Houses. He worked toward peaceful race relations as the head of the Bronx branch of the Urban League.

Walter Gladwin Park 

In 2020, commemorating the 51st anniversary of Black Solidarity Day, the New York City Parks Department renamed Tremont Park as Walter Gladwin Park.  The Parks Department noted that, "His legislative priorities included combating narcotics use among youth, improving housing for low-and middle-income constituents, strengthening civil rights guarantees and enforcement, and advocating for a state-sponsored summer camp program".

Personal life 
Gladwin was born in Berbice (spelled Verbice in some sources), British Guiana.  He was orphaned while a teenager, at which time he moved to the Bronx to live with an uncle. He attended City College, graduating in 1936, and New York Law School, graduating in 1941.  He earned money to pay for his education by working part-time jobs as a printer and as an elevator operator.

Gladwin and his wife Anna, had three daughters (Beryl, Phyllis, and Carol) and a son, Walter.  Gladwin retired as a judge in 1972, after which he moved to Highland Mills, New York where he resided for the rest of his life and was in private practice until 1983. He died of a heart attack on June 12, 1988, in Goshen, New York.

See also 
 List of African-American jurists

References 

1902 births
1988 deaths
Politicians from the Bronx
People from Orange County, New York
British Guiana people
Democratic Party members of the New York State Assembly
City College of New York alumni
New York Law School alumni